Patrick Lebon (2 January 1940 – 3 February 2021) was a Belgian film director and screenwriter.

Biography
Lebon studied at the Netherlands Film Academy in Amsterdam. He graduated in 1965, directing the film Huuh huuh. It is now the 17th greatest Belgian feature film of all time.

Patrick Lebon died on 3 February 2021 at the age of 81, one month and one day after his birthday.

References

1940 births
2021 deaths
Belgian film directors
Belgian screenwriters